is an arcade game that was released by Namco in 1983 only in Japan. It is based on the science of chemistry, and was also the first game from the company that had been confined to Japan since Kaitei Takara Sagashi in 1980.

Gameplay

The player must take control of the Chemic, a small black atom with red spikes which must adhere itself to passing Moleks (which come in four different colors: cyan, green, pink and yellow) in order to duplicate the patterns shown in the center of the screen; if a Molek adheres itself to the Chemic incorrectly, the player can press the button to disconnect the most recently connected Molek. A stage is completed by correctly replicating the Molek formation shown on the center of the screen. The yellow counter on the bottom of the screen signalizes how many Moleks are remaining, which decreases as more Moleks appear on screen. If the bar empties and the player has not replicated the Molek formation shown on the center of the screen, the round starts back from beginning.

The singular enemy in the game is the Atomic; a malevolent clump of balls which moves randomly around the screen, and will kill the Chemic if it comes in contact with it, costing a life. The Chemic can counter-attack by adhering itself to a Power Molek (which are slightly larger than the regular Moleks, and first appear in the game's second world). Once the Chemic has adhered itself to one, the adhered Moleks will spin around rapidly, and their speed will decrease to denote the nearing of the Power Molek's ending time limit. 

The Atomic occasionally initiates attacks to destroy the Chemic, which include splitting up and reforming in order to cover more ground, and shooting Alpha-Rays and Beta-Rays which destroy some of the Chemic's connected Moleks. There are total of eighteen unique patterns which must be duplicated in the game, and every fourth stage is a "challenging stage" where the Chemic can fire yellow Moleks in four directions at the Atomic.

Reception

In Japan, Game Machine listed Phozon on their December 15, 1983 issue as being the second most-popular arcade game at the time.

In North America, the game was demonstrated at the Amusement & Music Operators Association (AMOA) show in October 1983, but was not licensed for release in the region. Gene Lewin of Play Meter magazine gave it a favorable review, calling it "a very colorful and challenging game with a different twist" based on chemistry.

Legacy
Phozon was re-released as part of Namco Museum Volume 3 for the Sony PlayStation along with Dig Dug, Ms. Pac-Man, Pole Position II and other Namco games. Another port was released for the iOS and Android mobile device, as part of the Namco Arcade application. Ports of the game for the Nintendo Switch and PlayStation 4 were released by Hamster as part of the Arcade Archives series on November 25, 2021.

Notes

References

External links

1983 video games
Arcade video games
Arcade-only video games
Namco arcade games
Nintendo Switch games
PlayStation 4 games
Video games developed in Japan

Hamster Corporation games